Wendy Neuss (born 1954) is an American television and film producer.

Biography
Neuss graduated from the University of Pennsylvania in 1976 with a bachelor's degree in psychology.

Neuss was the executive producer of several TV films starring her ex-husband Patrick Stewart, including A Christmas Carol, The Lion in Winter and King of Texas. She produced these films as the president of Flying Freehold Productions, a company she co-founded with Stewart. She was co-producer on Star Trek: The Next Generation and a producer for the series Star Trek: Voyager. She has also produced the Motown series on the Showtime channel.

Neuss and Stewart divorced in 2003 after three years of marriage.

References

External links
 

1954 births
Living people
Film producers from New Jersey
University of Pennsylvania alumni
People from Livingston, New Jersey
American women television producers
Television producers from New Jersey
21st-century American women